Karin Alejandra O'Reilly Clashing (born 1992) is an Antiguan swimmer. She was born in San José, Costa Rica. She competed in the women's 50m freestyle at the 2012 Summer Olympics in London, finishing with a time of 30.02 seconds winning her heat, but did not qualify for the next round as she came in 55th place overall. Her mother, Edith O'Reilly Clashing, is her coach. She is a founding member of the Wadadli Aquatic Racers Swim Club. Her sister, Christal, competed in the 2004 Olympics in Athens, swimming the 50m freestyle as well.

References

1992 births
Living people
Sportspeople from San José, Costa Rica
Antigua and Barbuda female swimmers
Olympic swimmers of Antigua and Barbuda
Swimmers at the 2012 Summer Olympics